Bradney may refer to:

People with the surname
James Henry Bradney (1853–1936), a Member of Parliament in New Zealand
Sir Joseph Alfred Bradney (1859–1933), British soldier and historian noted for his History of Monmouthshire

Places
 Bradney, Shropshire, a location in England
 Bradney, Somerset, a hamlet within the parish of Bawdrip, England